This is the alphabetical list of 1149 species accepted as belonging to the genus Croton, as of March 2021.

A

B

C

D

E

F

G

H

I

J

K

L

M

N

O

P

Q

R

S

T

U

V

W

X

Y

Z

Reassigned taxa
Croton aromaticus, synonym of Mallotus tiliifolius 
Croton corymbulosus (encilla, manzanilla) is no longer accepted, Croton corymbulosus var. thermophilus  is a synonym of  Croton pottsii var. thermophilus 
Croton echinocarpus  is a synonym of Croton grandivelum 
Croton oblongifolius  is a synonym for  Chrozophora tinctoria 
Croton setigerus is no longer accepted
Croton torreyanus  (Torrey's croton) is now a synonym of Croton incanus 
Croton variegatum is no longer accepted

External links

References

Croton